Hünikon may refer to

 Hünikon, Thurgau, a settlement in the municipality of Amlikon-Bissegg in the Swiss canton of Thurgau
 Hünikon, Zürich, a settlement in the municipality of Neftenbach in the Swiss canton of Zürich